Kazakhstan President Cup is an annual international U-17 football tournament held under the aegis of the Football Federation of Kazakhstan and FIFA. The first edition took place in April 2008.

Format 
The tournament is held in two stages. At the first stage, six or eight teams are divided into two qualification groups (A and B). Competitions of the first stage were held on circular system. The winners of the groups advance to the final, while the group runners-up meet to determine third place.

About the tournament 

The tournament was established in order to further the development of football in Kazakhstan, including improving the quality and effectiveness of children’s sports schools; promote football among fans, the public and the media; improving the skills of youth players; and developing and strengthening international relations among the participants.

All matches of the 2015 edition will be broadcast on national television channel KAZsport.

Prize fund 
According to FFK, the prize fund of a tournament will make 15,000 $. "The teams which took 1, 2 and 3 place will be received, respectively 7,000, 5,000 and 3,000 $.

Participants of a tournament

Finals

Performance by countries

References

External links
España conquista la Copa Presidente do Kazajistán
España comienza la Copa Presidente con victoria ante Tayikistán (3-0)
La filosofia de juego te la Selección llega a Kazajistán
Qazaxistanda keçirilәcәl "Prezident Kuboku"nun tәqvimi müәyyәn olub
Millinin futbolçularina Qazaxistanda mükafat verildi

External links
 

 
Football competitions in Kazakhstan
Under-17 association football
2008 establishments in Kazakhstan
Recurring sporting events established in 2008